Carl Eugene Watts (November 7, 1953 – September 21, 2007), also known by his nickname Coral, was an American serial killer dubbed "The Sunday Morning Slasher" who murdered numerous women and girls over an eight-year period. He is suspected of being the most prolific serial killer in United States history. He died of prostate cancer while serving two sentences of life imprisonment without parole in a Michigan prison for the murders of Helen Dutcher and Gloria Steele, although the number of his victims may have exceeded 100.

Early life and criminal history 
Carl Eugene Watts was born in Killeen, Texas to Richard Eugene Watts and Dorothy Mae Young on November 7, 1953. His father was a private first class in the Army, and his mother was a kindergarten art teacher. They had both married in Coalwood, West Virginia. Before Carl was born, in 1942, Richard was transferred to Killeen and assigned to Fort Hood Army Base because it was chosen as the site for the American Army's Tank Destroyer Tactical and Firing centre. Three days after his birth, they returned to West Virginia, where they had grown up, and a year later, Sharon, their second child, was born. Watts' parents divorced when he was less than two-years-old due to an unsatisfactory marriage, and his mother raised him. In 1962, Dorothy Mae married Norman Caesar, a mechanic, with whom she had two daughters. The two moved to Inkster, Michigan where she found employment as a high school art teacher. Watts disliked his new stepfather, which made it difficult for him to adapt to his new familial environment. Watts claimed that he was referred to as a "mama's boy" and that he often worried about losing his mother's attention.

Dorothy Mae, Carl, and Sharon frequently visited Dorothy's mother and family in Coalwood, where Dorothy was born and raised. In the rural region near his grandmother's home, Carl learnt to hunt and skin rabbits with his grandfather at this time, an activity he really enjoyed. Carl later adopted the nickname "Coral," which was the southern pronunciation of his name, as a result of Watts' passion for the southern town and his native cousins. Coral reportedly had academic difficulties in Inkster but yet managed to get decent grades. Watts and his sister contracted meningitis when he was 8-years-old, which nearly killed him and caused him to be held back a year and miss the third grade.

Watts was brought to the Herman Kiefer Hospital, where he had to be kept apart from other patients and undergo spinal taps. Journalists claim that Watts' body temperature was so high that physicians worried it might have caused brain damage. After his illness, his family members also noticed a noticeable change in his personality, describing him as bashful, quiet, and introverted. His attention span dropped and he began to suffer from a poor memory. Watts struggled to keep up with other pupils when he returned to school since he had been held back one grade and had experienced chronic sleeplessness as a result of his sickness. Coral started having violent dreams about battling off and killing the wicked spirits of women, which interrupted his sleep cycle. When detectives questioned him about his crimes and asked him why he killed women, he responded that he wanted to "free their spirits" because they had "evil eyes."

By the time he was 12-years-old, according to Watts, he began to relish his sleep-induced fantasies of torturing and killing girls and young women. Teenage Watts started stalking girls at this time, and it is thought that he killed his first victim before the age of 15. He frequently received failing grades in school, and by the age of 16, he could read only at a fourth-grade level. He was severely bullied at school as well. Police were able to identify a 15-year-old Watts as a culprit in the assault on 26-year-old Joan Gave on June 29, 1969. While delivering newspapers on his route, Watts knocked on Gave's apartment door. Watts beat Gave when she opened the door and abused her violently. He then continued on his delivery route as if nothing happened. Gave immediately contacted the authorities who apprehended Coral at his home. He was ordered to undergo psychiatric treatment at the Lafayette Clinic in Detroit, a mental hospital. 

During a psychiatric evaluation, Coral was asked if his dreams and nightmarish-visions disturbed him, he replied, "No, I feel better after I have one" and claimed that they were not nightmares because "he enjoyed them." He further elaborated that his motivation for assaulting Gave was because he “just felt like beating someone up”. According to a psychiatric assessment, Watts was revealed to have a mild intellectual disability with an intelligence quotient of 75, and to have a delusional thought process and no evidence of psychosis. However, a police officer interrogating Watts after his arrest later stated that he appeared to be "very, very intelligent" with an "excellent memory." Also, Watts' psychiatrist later reported that Coral was an "impulsive individual who has a passive-aggressive orientation to life" and who is "struggling for control of strong homicidal impulses." He thought Coral posed a threat to society and hoped that the adolescent would benefit from outpatient therapy. He was discharged from the Lafayette Clinic on his sixteenth birthday and visited the facility nine more times for outpatient care throughout the ensuing years. During his time in various mental institutions, Watts was diagnosed with antisocial personality disorder.

Watts graduated from high school in 1973 at the age of 19, and was given a football scholarship to Lane College in Jackson, Tennessee, despite his subpar grades and sporadic drug use after his release. Watts said that exercising allowed him to let out his suppressed rage. He was able to achieve stardom as a football player and even greater success in boxing, becoming a Golden Gloves fighter. After just three months, he was dismissed from Lane College after being charged with stalking and assaulting women and receiving minor leg injuries. The fact that many people at Lane College thought Watts was a suspect in the violent killing of a female student—even though there was insufficient evidence to hold him accountable for the crime—was another factor in his expulsion. He briefly resided in Houston, Texas following his expulsion, and then spent a year working as a mechanic for a Detroit wheel manufacturer. In 1974, when Coral entered to Western Michigan University in Kalamazoo, a string of heinous assaults and attacks on women started to occur.

Murders
Watts' first confirmed murders took place when he was 20-years-old in 1974, by kidnapping his victims from their homes, torturing them, and then murdering them. He attacked in several different jurisdictions and even different states. Most of his victims were 
thin, attractive, white women, and he used methods such as strangulation, stabbing, bludgeoning, and drowning. His victims ranged between the ages of 14 and 44. Watts murdered dozens of women between 1974 and 1982, and despite the many women he murdered, he was not discovered as a serial killer for almost eight years. Even with the advent of DNA testing, it was still nearly impossible to connect them because he rarely performed sexual acts on his victims; his crimes were not thought to be sexually motivated.

Watts may have been involved in the disappearance of Nadine Jean O'Dell who was 16-years-old when she disappeared on August 16, 1974. She was last seen walking down John Daly Street in Inkster, Michigan on her way to babysit at her boyfriend's house in Taylor, Michigan. Her body has never been found and no one witnessed her presumed abduction.

At 10:45 a.m. on October 25, 1974, Coral knocked on 23-year-old Lenore Knizacky's apartment door. Coral called for "Charles," which was the name of one of his siblings, when she unlocked the door while the door was still chained. When she responded in the negative, she asked if he would like to leave a note and she undid the chain lock and went to get paper. Knizacky was then attacked by Coral who choked her into unconsciousness. Police were later alerted by Lenore, but they were unable to find her attacker. Gloria Steele, 20, was tortured and brutally killed by Watts on October 30, 1974. She is thought to have been his second victim. She attended Western Michigan University while raising her family. She was discovered with a crushed windpipe and 33 chest stab wounds from a wooden carving instrument. There were no witnesses other than Diane K. Williams, an apartment resident manager, who saw a black man "searching for Charles" strolling throughout the complex of apartments. When Coral saw her, he grabbed her, pushed her door open, and dragged Williams inside her apartment. Her phone started to ring as the two were fighting, so she knocked it off the hook and yelled for help. Williams spotted the man getting into a tan Pontiac Grand Prix as she stood up and peered out the window after her attacker fled. The police assembled a line-up, and Williams and Knizacky recognised Coral, who had just been apprehended stealing plywood from the campus of Western Michigan University. For both the Knizacky and Williams cases, he was taken into custody and charged with assault and battery. 

After being diagnosed with antisocial personality disorder and making an attempt on his life with a length of cord at the Kalamazoo Mental Hospital, Watts was moved to the Center for Forensic Psychiatry in Michigan. When Watts was questioned about the death of Steele in 1975, he acknowledged that he had been nearby the day before Gloria died, but he insisted that he had not killed her despite having admitted to attacking around fifteen other young women. When Detroit police executed a search order at Watts' residence, they discovered wooden carving tools but no evidence connecting him to Gloria's death. He entered a "no contest" plea at his trial for the assault and battery of Knizacky and Williams, and was sentenced to a year in the county jail. His psychologists classified him as being extremely hazardous, lacking in remorse for his crimes, impetuous, careless, and emotionally distant, with a high likelihood of recidivism.

Watts returned to Inkster after being released from prison in 1976 and moved in with his mother and stepfather. Coral impregnated Deloris Howard, a childhood friend, in 1979, and the two gave birth to Nakisha Watts. Shortly after, Coral and Deloris split up, and he soon after wed Valeria Goodwill. Goodwill claimed that shortly after their marriage, he started acting oddly. He kept moving the furniture around, using knives to chop up houseplants, broke candles and melted them into the table, and dumped trash all over the floors without picking it up. He would also get up and depart after they had sex or had an "intimate encounter" and would disappear for several hours at a time. Their union only lasted for six months.

Five women were attacked and killed in the Detroit region over the course of a year by a perpetrator who was dubbed by Ann Arbor newspapers as the "Sunday Morning Slasher" since all of the attacks took place on Sunday mornings at around 4 a.m. On October 31, 1979, Jeanne Clyne, a 44-year-old reporter for Detroit News, walked home after a doctor's appointment, and was attacked. She was approached in broad daylight next to her Grosse Point Farms home on a major suburban road. Eleven stab wounds resulted in her death. Insufficient evidence was discovered by the police to identify a suspect. Detectives initially suspected Jeanne's husband, but once Coral admitted to her murder, they ruled him out.

Shirley Small, a 17-year-old high school student from Ann Arbor, Michigan, was fatally stabbed twice in the heart outside her home on April 20, 1980. Glenda Richmond, 26, was the victim of a comparable assault on July 13, 1980, in front of her summer residence in the Ann Arbor region. A diner manager, she sustained 28 knife wounds to her chest. At both crime scenes, there was insufficient evidence to convict anyone. However, both of the murders displayed characteristics of Watts' crimes. Graduate student Rebecca Huff, age 20, of the University of Michigan, was found dead on September 14, 1980, in front of her house. She had suffered about 50 stab wounds. Her case was the first homicide that could be directly attributed to Coral.

A 20-year-old lady named "Dalpe" was attacked and stabbed on October 6 but managed to live. She ended up with partially paralysed muscles, weak muscles, could hardly eat or move her head, and her arms barely moved over her head due to the deep slashes she sustained to her face, one of which ruptured her jugular vein. On November 1, "Angus," a 30-year-old woman, spotted a black man wearing a hooded sweatshirt as she was making her way home from a Halloween party. She kept an eye on him. He bent down to tie his shoe as soon as she pulled out her keys and then immediately followed her. She ran to her front door while screaming at the top of her lungs. He was startled by her response, so he turned and fled the other way. She identified Coral Watts from a line-up of photos, but she was not sure because the outside area was dimly lighted at the time of her attack.

Canadian authorities also believe Watts crossed the border into Windsor, Ontario that October, assaulting 20-year-old Sandra Dalpe outside her apartment, leaving her near death with multiple wounds to the face and throat but she survived. By that time, Watts had fallen under scrutiny from local homicide investigators. A task force was organized in July 1980 to probe the Sunday slashings, and Watts was placed under sporadic surveillance; a November court order permitted officers to plant a homing device in his car.

On November 15, at around five in the morning, two police officers on patrol in the vicinity of Main Street in Ann Arbor saw a suspicious man following a woman who was walking home in a car. She attempted to hide in a doorway after realising she was being followed in the hopes that her stalker would lose her. Coral "nearly went crazy" when he lost track of the woman he was pursuing. Coral was detained by the police after they pulled over his automobile for having outdated licence plates and a suspended licence. Additionally, they examined his car and discovered a package containing wood-filing equipment and a few screwdrivers. Their most important discovery, however, was a dictionary that belonged to Huff and had the carved phrase "Rebecca is a lover" on it. It was insufficient proof, though, to hold him responsible for her slaying. Coral relocated to Columbus, Texas, in the spring of 1981, where he worked for an oil firm. He spent his weekend nights travelling more than 70 miles to his next hunting ground in the Houston region.

Arrest and discovery
Michele Maday, then 20-years-old, answered the door to her Houston apartment on May 23, 1982, to find a suspicious-looking man standing there. Unexpectedly, the stranger assaulted, beat, and choked her until she passed out. The man entered her bathroom, filled the tub with water, and drowned her while she was still lying on the floor before departing the area. Later that day, Melinda Aguilar, 18, and Lori Lister, 21, had their Houston apartment broken into by Watts. He choked Lister down the steps below the flat while she was returning from work. Then he went inside the apartment and started to choke Aguilar too. Aguilar pretended to be unconscious while Watts wire-tied her hands behind her back. In order to drown Lister, he hauled her body upstairs and into the bathroom, where he filled the bathtub with water. Aguilar was able to escape while Watts was focused on Lister and leapt out of a window to get assistance. Lister was saved, and Watts was apprehended after evading capture. While Watts was being held, investigators started to connect him to several recent killings of women. Prosecutors in Texas did not believe they had enough evidence to find Watts guilty of murder, though.

In May 1982, after the attacks on Melinda Aguilar and Lori Lister, Harris County Assistant District Attorney Ira Jones brokered a plea bargain. Watts would only be charged with burglary with intent to murder if he confessed fully to his crimes and received immunity from prosecution on the murder accusations. A 60-year sentence was imposed for this offence. The deal was accepted, and he later led the detectives to the graves of three of his victims. Coral finally acknowledged attacking 19 women, murdering 13 of them. Coral admitted to killing 44-year-old Jeanne Clyne in Detroit in 1979, but he refrained from confessing to the deaths of Glenda Richard, Shirley Small, or Rebecca Huff. However, Michigan authorities refused to go in on the deal so the cases in that state remained open.

Linda Tilley, 22, a student at the University of Texas, was drowned in the swimming pool of her apartment complex in September 1981, according to his confession. One week later, he also killed Elizabeth Montgomery, 25, by stabbing her. Susan Wolf, 21, was several steps from her apartment when she was fatally stabbed in the arm and chest while going home after purchasing ice cream from a grocery store. Coral acknowledged another murder from January 1982—that of 27-year-old Phyllis Tamm, who was attacked while jogging. Coral alleged that after choking her with his hands, he tied an elastic strap to a tree branch and hung her there.

Margret Fossi, a 25-year-old architecture student who appeared to have passed away from a strike to the throat, was murdered by Coral almost two days later. At Rice University, her body was discovered in the trunk of her vehicle. Coral claimed that he burnt her shoes, her pocketbook, the blueprints she was carrying, and her belongings in an effort to "destroy her spirit." Additionally, Watts said to authorities that on January 16 he later saw Julia Sanchez, a young woman, attempting to fix a flat tyre on a motorway. Sanchez was left for dead after Watts sliced her throat. Despite this, she lived. Coral claimed to have assaulted two additional women in the Houston region that same month. Patty Johnson, then 19-years-old, was attacked on January 30, 1982 as she exited her car on her way home. Watts slashed her throat in an attempt to kill her. Watts left after hearing someone yell who had heard what was happening. Johnson survived, and up until Watts admitted guilt, another man had received a life sentence for the assault. The second victim Watts cited was "Martell," a 19-year-old who had been attacked outside of her residence and stabbed three times with a screwdriver but had managed to survive.

Coral also admitted to killing Elena Semander, 20, Emily LaQua, 14, Anna Ledet, 34, Yolanda Gracia, 21, Carrie Jefferson, 32, Suzanne Searles, 25, and Michele Maday, 20, between February and May 1982. Coral was never put on trial for the majority of the murders despite his confessions due to the agreement he made.

Michigan trial
Watts was sentenced to the agreed 60 years in 1982. However, shortly after he began serving time, the Texas Court of Appeals ruled that he had not been informed that the bathtub and water he attempted to drown Lori Lister in was considered a deadly weapon. The ruling reclassified him as a non-violent felon, making him eligible for early release. At the time, Texas law allowed nonviolent felons to have three days deducted from their sentences for every one day served as long as they were well behaved. Watts was a model prisoner, and had enough time deducted from his sentence that he could have been released as early as May 9, 2006. The law allowing early release was abolished after public outcry, but could not be applied retroactively according to the Texas Constitution.

In 2004, Michigan Attorney General Mike Cox went on national television asking for anyone to come forward with information in order to try to convict Watts of murder to ensure he was not released. Joseph Foy of Westland, Michigan, came forward to say that he had seen a man fitting Watts' description murder Helen Dutcher, a 36-year-old woman who died after being stabbed 12 times on December 1, 1979. Foy identified Watts by his eyes, which he described as being "evil" and devoid of emotion. Although Watts had immunity from prosecution for the 13 killings he had admitted to in Texas, he had no immunity agreement in Michigan. Before his 2004 trial, law enforcement officials asked the trial judge to allow the Texas confessions into evidence, to which he agreed. 

Watts was promptly charged with the murder of Helen Dutcher. A Michigan jury convicted him on November 17, 2004, after hearing eyewitness testimony from Joseph Foy. On December 7, he was sentenced to life imprisonment. Two days later, authorities in Michigan started making moves to try him for the murder of Western Michigan University student Gloria Steele, who was stabbed to death in 1974. Watts' trial for the Steele murder began in Kalamazoo, Michigan on July 25, 2007; closing arguments concluded July 26. The following day the jury returned a guilty verdict. Watts was sentenced to life imprisonment without parole on September 13. He was incarcerated at a maximum security prison in Ionia, Michigan. He died of prostate cancer on September 21, 2007, in a Jackson, Michigan hospital.

Victims
Watts officially confessed to the murders of 13 women but later claimed he had killed 40 women, and also implied that there were more than 80 victims in total. He would not confess outright to having committed these murders, however, because he did not want to be seen as a "mass murderer". Police still consider Watts a suspect in 90 unsolved murders. Watts is now suspected to have killed more than 100 women, which would make him the most prolific serial killer in American history. The following is a summary of confirmed and suspected murders that have been linked to Watts:
September 6, 1972: Zenaida Tomes, 20, was discovered in a field in Taylor, Michigan, adjacent to North Line Road and Lange Close. She had suffered 45 stab wounds. Over the years, rumours have circulated that Tomes' death may have been caused by Watts, who was present in the area at the time. However, she was taken from Detroit and murdered somewhere else, which is contradictory with Watts' known modus operandi, therefore officials are less convinced that he was involved.
August, 16, 1974: At 9:30 in the morning, Nadine Jean O'Dell, a 16-year-old girl, was last seen on John Daly Road in Inkster, Michigan, heading toward Michigan Avenue. She was going to meet her boyfriend in Taylor, Michigan, where she was going to babysit at his house. Nadine never made it to the house when he did.
October 30, 1974: Gloria Steele, a 19-year-old Western Michigan University student, was attacked and fatally stabbed 33 times in her Kalamazoo, Michigan apartment. In 2004, Watts was convicted of killing the woman.
September 21, 1979: Malak “Mimi” Haddad, 34, was found headless in Allen Park, Michigan.  Her case is still open, and her head was never found.
October 2, 1979: Dawn Jerome, 20, was found strangled to death in Taylor, Michigan.
October 8, 1979: Peggy Pochmara, 22, was discovered dead in Detroit, strangled, in the front yard of her boyfriend's neighbour.
October 31, 1979: Jeanne Clyne, 44, was stabbed to death on a sidewalk in Grosse Point Farms, a Detroit suburb, as she made her way home from a doctor's appointment. With a screwdriver-like woodworking tool, she had been stabbed 13 times.
December 1, 1979: Helen Mae Dutcher, 36, was attacked by a man who repeatedly stabbed her in the neck and back in an alleyway near a Ferndale dry cleaners in Detroit. Twelve stab wounds caused Dutcher's death. Witness Joseph Foy contributed to Watts' 2004 conviction for her slaying.
March 10, 1980: Hazel Connof, 23, was discovered with her belt around her neck attached to a chain-link fence in the Detroit driveway of her boyfriend. 
March 31, 1980: Denise Dunmore, 26, was found strangled in a Detroit parking lot outside her home.
April 20, 1980: Seventy feet from her apartment, at 2820 Page Street in Ann Arbor, Michigan, Shirley Small, 17, was discovered dead from two stab wounds to the heart and six major cuts on her face. Small did not experience a sexual assault. Small went to a Big Boy Restaurant in Ypsilanti after spending time with friends at a Farmington roller skating rink. Because she was angry with her partner after their recent breakup, she avoided entering the restaurant with her friends. She started walking from Ypsilanti to Ann Arbor as her boyfriend drove along the route he believed she was taking to get home in search of her. At 3:45 a.m., he discovered her strolling up Packard Road toward her house. She declined his two attempts to give her a ride and kept on walking. She was slain at 4:45 in the morning.
May 31, 1980: Linda Monteiro, 27, was found strangled outside her Detroit home.
July 13, 1980: The body of 17-year-old Glenda Richmond was discovered stabbed to death in Braeburn, Michigan, on the south side of the city. Richmond, who worked at a Brown Jug Restaurant, was murdered after she finished work. With a screwdriver, she was stabbed 28 times in the left breast. A neighbour discovered her body laying in the grass just 27 feet from her front door. 
July 31, 1980: 28-year-old Lilli Marlene Dunn was last seen at around 3 a.m. on Agnes Street in Southgate, Michigan. She had left her house at 6:30 p.m. to go bowling, after which she and some companions proceeded to a bar on Ford Road in Dearborn, Michigan. She got home around 2:30 in the morning. Someone attacked her right after she had parked her car in her garage. She was thrown into a light-colored vehicle while kicking and screaming. Her handbag, hairbrush, and shoes were later discovered by authorities on the street. Her captor is believed to have followed her home. Authorities believe Dunn could have been a victim of Watts.
September 15, 1980: Flight attendant Rebecca Greer Huff, 30, was fatally stabbed in the Waldenwood Unit Complex in Ann Arbor, Michigan, at around 4:30 a.m. while returning to her apartment. She had not been sexually abused, but she had been stabbed 54 times with a screwdriver. When the killer approached Huff, she had already gotten out of her car and was heading toward the entrance. A witness first heard screaming before seeing a man run and get into a car. 
November 6, 1980: Lena J. Bennett, 63, was discovered in her garage in Harper Woods, Michigan, hanging from a beam by a trench coat belt. She had a wooden broomstick pushed into her vagina during the assault.
August 26, 1981: Edith Anna Ledet, 34, of Galveston, Texas, was stabbed to death as she jogged.
September 3, 1981: Susan Wolf, 21, was stabbed in the arm and chest outside her Houston apartment as she carried groceries from her car.
September 5, 1981: 22-year-old Linda Tilley was murdered in the swimming pool at her Austin apartment building. Watts had been following a different female from Houston for several hours that day but had lost track of her in Austin before spotting Tilley and following her inside her apartment building. When she attempted to fight him off, they both fell into a pool, where he held her down until she drowned. Until Watts confessed, Tilley's death had been thought to be accidental.
September 12, 1981: Elizabeth Montgomery, 25, was stabbed once outside her Houston apartment while she walked her dog. 
January 4, 1982: The body of Phyllis Tamm, 27, was discovered hanging from a tree not far from Rice University in Houston. Early in the morning, she was out running alone when she was attacked and hung by her tube top from a branch. It was not until Watts' confession that Tamm's death was deemed a homicide. The medical examiner ruled her death as a suicide.
January 17, 1982: Margaret Fossi, a 25-year-old architecture student, was discovered dead in the trunk of her parked automobile at Rice University. A day before, she had been reported missing. Asphyxia had been brought about by a hit to the throat which claimed Fossi's life. 
February 7, 1982: Elena Semander, 20, was found dead in a Houston trash bin after she had been strangled with her shirt.
February 16, 1982: Hale County Jane Doe was an unidentified woman whose badly decomposed headless and nude body was discovered on a dirt road in the Texas desert outside of Hale County. The woman was in her late teens to early twenties when she was discovered with her hands bound behind her back.
March 20, 1982: Emily Elizabeth LaQua, 14, was killed while travelling to Brookshire to start a new job as a waitress. She had recently relocated from Seattle to Texas to live with her father, and at first it was assumed that she had disappeared on her own accord. Five months later, her body was discovered stuffed in a culvert. This is the only case for which Watts did not receive legal immunity.
March 27, 1982: Edith Ledet, 34, was stabbed to death in Galveston as she returned home from a graduation party.
April 15, 1982: Yolanda Gracia, 21, was stabbed to death on her front lawn as she returned home.
April 16, 1982: Carrie Mae Jefferson, 32, was stabbed twice while she was walking home from her job at the downtown post office in Houston. Jefferson's body was buried by Watts at White Oak Bayou.
April 21, 1982: Suzanne Searles, 25, was taken as she made her way home from a party. According to Watts, he held her head in a flowerpot filled with water because he could not tell if she was dead after he had strangled her. Watts buried Searles. He took police to her grave as soon as he confessed in 1982.
May 23, 1982: Michelle Maday, 20, was returning home about 4 a.m. when Watts choked her to death outside her apartment. According to Watts, he brought Maday's body inside and dumped it in her bathtub. After attempting to murder Melinda Aguilar and Lori Lister, Watts was apprehended.

See also 
 List of homicides in Michigan
 List of serial killers in the United States
 List of serial killers by number of victims

References

Bibliography

External links
Coral Eugene Watts at Crime Library

1953 births
2007 deaths
20th-century American criminals
African-American people
American male criminals
American people convicted of murder
American people who died in prison custody
American prisoners sentenced to life imprisonment
American murderers of children
American rapists
American serial killers
Deaths from cancer in Michigan
Deaths from prostate cancer
Lane Dragons football players
Male serial killers
People convicted of murder by Michigan
People from Inkster, Michigan
People from Killeen, Texas
People with antisocial personality disorder
Prisoners and detainees of Texas
Prisoners sentenced to life imprisonment by Michigan
Prisoners who died in Michigan detention
Serial killers who died in prison custody
Violence against women in the United States